In algebra, a Mordell curve is an elliptic curve of the form y2 = x3 + n, where n is a fixed non-zero integer.

These curves were closely studied by Louis Mordell, from the point of view of determining their integer points. He showed that every Mordell curve contains only finitely many integer points (x, y). In other words, the differences of perfect squares and perfect cubes tend to infinity. The question of how fast was dealt with in principle by Baker's method. Hypothetically this issue is dealt with by Marshall Hall's conjecture.

Properties
If (x, y) is an integer point on a Mordell curve, then so is (x, -y).

There are certain values of n for which the corresponding Mordell curve has no integer solutions; these values are:
 6, 7, 11, 13, 14, 20, 21, 23, 29, 32, 34, 39, 42, ... .
 −3, −5, −6, −9, −10, −12, −14, −16, −17, −21, −22, ... .

The specific case where n = −2 is also known as Fermat's Sandwich Theorem.

List of solutions 

The following is a list of solutions to the Mordell curve y2 = x3 + n for |n| ≤ 25. Only solutions with y ≥ 0 are shown.

In 1998, J. Gebel, A. Pethö, H. G. Zimmer found all integers points for 0 < |n| ≤ 104.

In 2015, M. A. Bennett and A. Ghadermarzi computed integer points for 0 < |n| ≤ 107.

References

External links
 J. Gebel, Data on Mordell's curves for –10000 ≤ n ≤ 10000
 M. Bennett, Data on Mordell curves for –107 ≤ n ≤ 107

Algebraic curves
Diophantine equations
Elliptic curves